Kennedy Roberts (born 17 June 1962) is a politician and diplomat from Grenada.  He has served as a member of the Senate of Grenada, and has been cultural attached to that nation's embassy in Cuba.  He was born in Petite Martinique to Conrad and Cora Roberts, and is a member of the New National Party. He is married to Nikoyan Roberts and is the father of two children.

References
Candidate profile on party website

1962 births
Living people
Members of the Senate of Grenada
New National Party (Grenada) politicians
Grenadian diplomats
People from Petite Martinique